Japan competed at the 2004 Summer Olympics in Athens, Greece, from 13 to 29 August 2004. Japanese athletes have competed at every Summer Olympic Games in the modern era since 1912 except for two editions; it was not invited to the 1948 Summer Olympics in London for its role in World War II, and was also part of the US-led boycott of the 1980 Summer Olympics in Moscow. The Japanese Olympic Committee sent a total of 306 athletes, 139 men and 167 women, to compete in 27 sports. For the first time in its Olympic history, Japan was represented by more female than male athletes.

Japan left Athens with a total of 37 medals (16 gold, 9 silver, and 12 bronze), finishing fifth in the overall medal rankings. This was also the nation's most successful Olympics, winning the largest number of gold and overall medals in non-boycotting games and surpassing three gold medals short of the 1956 Summer Olympics in Melbourne. Ten of these medals were awarded to the athletes in judo, eight in swimming, six in wrestling, four in gymnastics, and two each in athletics and synchronized swimming. Eight Japanese athletes won more than a single Olympic medal in Athens. Japan's team-based athletes came strong and successful in Athens, as the baseball and softball teams managed to produce two bronze medals.

Among the nation's medalists were freestyle wrestlers Saori Yoshida and Kaori Icho, who both claimed their gold medals in women's wrestling for the first time, and judoka Tadahiro Nomura and Ryoko Tani, who both successfully defended Olympic titles in their respective classes. Swimmer Kosuke Kitajima became the most successful Japanese athlete in these games, striking a breaststroke double with two golds and adding a bronze to his career hardware for the team in men's medley relay. Meanwhile, synchronized swimmers Miya Tachibana and Miho Takeda managed to repeat their silver medals from Sydney in both women's duet and team routines. Takehiro Kashima, Hiroyuki Tomita, and Isao Yoneda claimed two individual medals each in men's artistic gymnastics, including their coveted gold in the team all-around.

On August 29, 2004, the International Olympic Committee stripped off Hungary's Adrián Annus hammer throw title after failing the doping test, and the gold medal was subsequently awarded to Koji Murofushi at the conclusion of the Games, making him the nation's first ever Olympic champion in the field event.

Medalists

|  style="text-align:left; width:72%; vertical-align:top;"|

|  style="text-align:left; width:23%; vertical-align:top;"|

Archery 

Three Japanese archers qualified each for the men's and women's individual archery, and a spot each for both men's and women's teams.

Men

Women

Athletics 

Japanese athletes have so far achieved qualifying standards in the following athletics events (up to a maximum of 3 athletes in each event at the 'A' Standard, and 1 at the 'B' Standard). The team was selected based on the results of the 2004 Japan Championships in Athletics.

Koji Murofushi originally claimed a silver medal in men's hammer throw. On August 29, 2004, the International Olympic Committee stripped off Hungary's Adrián Annus hammer throw title after failing the doping test. Following the announcement of Annus' disqualification, Murofushi's medal was eventually upgraded to gold.

Men
Track & road events

Field events

Women
Track & road events

Field events

Combined events – Heptathlon

Badminton 

Men

Women

Mixed

Baseball 

Roster
Manager: 33 – Kiyoshi Nakahata

Coaches: 31 – Yutaka Takagi, 32 – Yutaka Ohno

Preliminary round

Semifinal

Bronze Medal Final

 Won Bronze Medal

Basketball

Women's tournament

Roster

Group play

9th-10th Place Final

Boxing

Japan sent one boxer to the 2004 Olympics.

Canoeing

Sprint

Qualification Legend: Q = Qualify to final; q = Qualify to semifinal

Cycling

Road

Track
Sprint

Time trial

Keirin

Omnium

Mountain biking

Diving 

Japanese divers qualified two spots each in men's springboard and women's platform.

Men

Women

Equestrian

Show jumping

Fencing

Five fencers, two men and three women, represented Japan in 2004.

Men

Women

Field hockey

Women's tournament

Roster

Group play

5th-8th Place Semifinal

7th-8th Place Final

Football

Men's tournament

Roster

Group play

Women's tournament

Roster

Group play

Quarterfinal

Gymnastics

Artistic
Men
Team

Individual finals

Women

Rhythmic

Trampoline

Judo

Fourteen Japanese judoka (seven males and five females) qualified for the 2004 Summer Olympics.

Men

Women

Rowing

The Japanese rowers qualified the following boats:

Men

Women

Qualification Legend: FA=Final A (medal); FB=Final B (non-medal); FC=Final C (non-medal); FD=Final D (non-medal); FE=Final E (non-medal); FF=Final F (non-medal); SA/B=Semifinals A/B; SC/D=Semifinals C/D; SE/F=Semifinals E/F; R=Repechage

Sailing

Japanese sailors have qualified one boat for each of the following events.

Men

Women

Open

M = Medal race; OCS = On course side of the starting line; DSQ = Disqualified; DNF = Did not finish; DNS= Did not start; RDG = Redress given

Shooting 

Nine Japanese shooters (three men and six women) qualified to compete in the following events:

Men

Women

Softball

In the final game of the preliminary round, Yukiko Ueno of Japan pitched the first perfect game in Olympic softball history as Japan defeated China 2-0.  Two days later, Japan again defeated China in the 3rd/4th semifinal to guarantee a medal.  Their loss in the bronze medal game left them with the bronze.

Team Roster

Preliminary Round

Semifinal

Bronze Medal Game

 Won Bronze Medal

Swimming 

Japanese swimmers earned qualifying standards in the following events (up to a maximum of 2 swimmers in each event at the A-standard time, and 1 at the B-standard 
time):

Men

Women

Synchronized swimming 

Nine Japanese synchronized swimmers qualified a spot in the women's team.

Table tennis

Eight Japanese table tennis players (five men and three women) qualified for the following events.

Men

Women

Taekwondo

Japan has qualified one taekwondo jin.

Tennis

Triathlon

Five Japanese triathletes qualified for the following events.

Volleyball

Beach

Indoor

Women's tournament

Roster

Group play

Quarterfinal

Weightlifting 

Four Japanese weightlifters qualified for the following events:

Wrestling 

Men's freestyle

Men's Greco-Roman

Women's freestyle

See also
 Japan at the 2002 Asian Games
 Japan at the 2004 Summer Paralympics

References

External links
Official Report of the XXVIII Olympiad
Japanese Olympic Committee

Nations at the 2004 Summer Olympics
2004
Summer Olympics